The Rev. Patrick Winters S.A.C. (1908-1994) was an Irish born Pallottine priest, who served as Bishop of the Roman Catholic Diocese of Mbulu in Tanzania, from 1953 until in 1971.

Patrick Winters was born at Ramore, Killimor, Co. Galway, he was educated at St. Joseph's College, Garbally Park, Ballinasloe. After working for four years, Winters entered the Pallottine College in Thurles to train as a priest. While in Thurles he would have studied philosophy at St. Patrick's College, Thurles. Winters moved to Rome to study theology at the Gregorian University between 1935 and 1939 and was ordained priest on 3 July 1938 and obtained his Licentiate in Sacred Theology in 1939.

Upon his retirement he moved back to Ireland and served as a priest. His latter life was spent in the Pallottine College in Thurles where he died on 1 April (Good Friday) in 1994 and is buried in the Pallottine Community Cemetery, St. Mary's, Cabra, Thurles.

References

1904 births
1994 deaths
People from County Galway
Alumni of St. Patrick's College, Thurles
Irish expatriates in Tanzania
Pallottine bishops
20th-century Roman Catholic bishops in Tanzania
Roman Catholic bishops of Mbulu